Daniel Adler may refer to:
 Daniel Adler (prosecutor) (born 1958), from Argentina
 Daniel Adler (sailor) (born 1958), from Brazil